The Bourke Isles are a group of islands and islets in the archipelago known as the Torres Strait Islands, located west of the Cumberland Passage in the Torres Strait, and are part of the state of Queensland, Australia.

The Bourke Isles, which comprise seven small islands or islets, are located within the Torres Strait Island Region, a Queensland local government area.

The islands
The named Bourke Isles include:
Aukane Islet
Aureed Island
Bourke Island
Kabbikane Islet
Layoak Islet
Mimi Islet
Roberts Islet
Yam Island

History
The islands were named in mid-1836 by Charles Lewis, the Commander of the schooner Isabella from the Colony of New South Wales, in honour of Richard Bourke, at the time, the Governor of New South Wales.

Aureed

In June 1836, the colonial schooner Isabella was despatched from Sydney under Captain Lewis to search for survivors of the barque Charles Eaton, which had been wrecked on the Great Detached Reef, part of the Great Barrier Reef near the Sir Charles Hardy Islands on 15 August 1834. It turned out that most of the crew and passengers who had survived the wreck and sailed on rafts to the Torres Strait, had been killed by Torres Strait Islanders from Mer, but a cabin boy and infant boy had been spared and lived with the Mer people for two years. The two survivors were rescued by Captain Lewis, after which Captain Lewis and his crew took masks from Mer while interacting with the local people.

After being told by a group of locals on the island of Massid (Yorke Island, or Masig) that men from Aureed had taken skulls back to that island, Lewis went to explore the group of small islands that he called the "Six Sisters", one of which was Aureed. Anchoring there, armed men went on to the island and found it deserted, the village abandoned. After burning the village to the ground, the men found a dilapidated shed, and in it a huge mask made of a single decorated turtle shell surrounded by human skulls of Europeans. This was later identified as a "skull house" used by the Kulka fraternity of a local cult. Lewis and his men took the skulls and mask, and set fire to everything on the island, including plantations of tobacco. Lewis dubbed the island "Skull Island", although this name was not taken up.

See also

List of Torres Strait Islands

References

Torres Strait Islands
Torres Strait Island Region